The Malagasy crowned eagle (Stephanoaetus mahery), also known as the Madagascar crowned hawk-eagle, is an extinct large bird of prey endemic to Madagascar. 

It has been proposed that this bird, combined with elephant bird eggs, were the source of sightings of the mythical Roc.

Description

Ecology
It probably fed on lemurs. The raptor avoidance behaviour exhibited by contemporary adult lemurs may have originated in response to this (and another now-extinct Malagasy Aquila) eagle; extant Malagasy raptors appear to be a threat primarily to juvenile members of the large diurnal lemur species.

It was perhaps an apex predator of the Malagasy forests, along with the giant fossa and the Voay crocodile. It likely became extinct in the 16th century due to human overhunting of its prey.

See also 

 Haast's eagle, another large island eagle species that became extinct after the arrival of humans

References

External links
Endangered Species Handbook (Madagascar)

Stephanoaetus
Late Quaternary prehistoric birds
Holocene extinctions
Extinct birds of Madagascar
Prehistoric animals of Madagascar
Birds described in 1994
Fossil taxa described in 1994
Roc (mythology)
Species made extinct by human activities
Birds of prey of Madagascar